Souls at Sea is a 1937 American adventure film directed by Henry Hathaway and starring Gary Cooper and George Raft. Based on a story by Ted Lesser, the film is about a first mate on a slave ship who frees the slaves on the ship after a mutiny overthrows the ship's captain. The title of this film was spoofed in the Laurel and Hardy comedy film Saps at Sea (1940). The supporting cast features Frances Dee, Harry Carey, Joseph Schildkraut, Robert Cummings, George Zucco, Tully Marshall, Monte Blue, and an uncredited Alan Ladd and Edward Van Sloan.

Plot
Abolitionist Michael "Nuggin" Taylor goes undercover to sabotage slave ships. Although the United States prohibited the importation of slaves in 1808, slaves are still being brought into the country illegally. Great Britain also prohibited the slave trade, putting the Royal Navy into action against slave traders, but Royal Navy Lieutenant Stanley Tarryton is acting for the slave traders. The conflict between Taylor and Tarryton is complicated by Tarryton's sister Margaret, who is falling in love with Taylor.

The Taylor-Tarryton conflict becomes entangled with the loss of the ship William Brown. The William Brown is accidentally set on fire by a little girl, and must be abandoned. Taylor is a passenger on the ship, and he takes command of the evacuation when the captain is injured. Only one lifeboat is launched, which cannot carry all the survivors, many of whom are swimming in the ocean nearby. Taylor stops these desperate people from climbing into the lifeboat and swamping it, shooting some with a pistol. As a result, he is subsequently tried and convicted for murder; Barton Woodley explains his actions, thus resulting in a new trial for Taylor. Margaret, seeing Taylor in this new light, lets him know she still loves him.

Cast

Production
The film was made during the period of the studio system; when George Raft initially turned down his part, he was suspended. Lloyd Nolan and Anthony Quinn stood by to replace him. Raft agreed to play the role when it was rewritten to be more sympathetic.

Cummings was cast in October 1936.

Filming began 9 November 1936.

In November 1936, silent film star John Bowers heard that his old friend Henry Hathaway was directing Gary Cooper in Souls at Sea off the shore of Santa Catalina. On November 17, the 50-year-old actor rented a sixteen-foot sloop and sailed to the island, hoping to land a part in the picture, only to learn that it had been cast. Bowers never returned to shore, and his body was found on the beach at Santa Monica, California. Bowers' life and death is identified as inspiration for the character Norman Maine in A Star Is Born (1937).

Historical influence
The real  William Brown hit an iceberg and sank on 19 April 1841, with loss of life. A seaman, one Alexander Holmes, acted similarly to Taylor's actions in the film. He was convicted in 1842 of manslaughter, but sentenced only to a $20 fine ($ today) and six months imprisonment.

Reception
Frank S. Nugent of The New York Times did not think the film was worthy of serious analysis but described it as "a proper tale of high adventure on the high seas." Variety called it "a good picture" with "bold, brave and sweeping" direction. Harrison's Reports praised the "outstanding" production but found the scenes of beatings and killings to be "sadistic" rather than entertaining. John Mosher of The New Yorker called the film "a disappointment," finding a crowded lifeboat scene to be exciting but remarking that the story seemed to be "lost in a maze of plot fidgeting."

Academy Award nominations
Hans Dreier and Roland Anderson were nominated for Best Art Direction; Hal Walker for Best Assistant Director (in the last year it was awarded); and Boris Morros, as head of the Paramount Studios Music Department, for Music (scoring) (score by W. Franke Harling and Milan Roder).

See also
 Seven Waves Away (1957) - also dealt with the limits of lifeboat space and decisions of the first mate

References

External links
 
 

1937 films
1930s adventure drama films
American adventure drama films
American black-and-white films
1930s English-language films
Films about slavery
Films directed by Henry Hathaway
Seafaring films
Films set on ships
Films set in the 1840s
Paramount Pictures films
1930s American films